Chorthippus jutlandica, the Jutland bow-winged grasshopper, is a species of grasshopper in the subfamily Gomphocerinae. It is one of the few species endemic to Denmark and is found only at a very restricted location near Blåvandshuk in the western part of the country.

References 

jutlandica
Orthoptera of Europe
Endemic fauna of Denmark
Insects described in 2003